Lubertus Cornelis "Bert" Groen  (born 28 March 1945 in Haarlem) is a Dutch corporate director and former civil servant and politician of the Reformed Political League (GPV) and his successor the ChristianUnion (ChristenUnie). From 2002 to 2003 he was a Senator for the latter.

Groen was Mayor of Oldehove and Bunschoten, and a member of the provincial parliament of Groningen.

Groen is a member of the Reformed Churches in the Netherlands (Liberated) and Knight of the Order of Orange-Nassau.

References
  Parlement.com biography

1945 births
Living people
21st-century Dutch politicians
Christian Union (Netherlands) politicians
Dutch civil servants
Dutch corporate directors
Knights of the Order of Orange-Nassau
Mayors in Utrecht (province)
People from Bunschoten
Members of the Senate (Netherlands)
Members of the Provincial Council of Groningen
Politicians from Haarlem
Reformed Churches (Liberated) Christians from the Netherlands
Reformed Political League politicians